Paun Janković (Smederevo, 1808 – Smederevo, 25 July 1865) was a Serbian politician who held the post of Prime Minister of Serbia, Minister of Finance, Ministe of External affairs and Minister of Justice and Education. Janković was one of the notable Defenders of the Constitution.

Baća was born in 1808 in Konjska (later Mihailovac) in Smederevo nahija. His father, Janko Đurđević, was a counselor for the Smederevo nahija during the time of Karađorđe. He was educated in Russia, and returned to Serbia at the invitation of Prince Miloš Obrenović, and joined him as a clerk in the prince's chancery, which served as a government. He was later promoted to Director of the Prince's chancery. He wrote many letters under the dictatorship of Prince Miloš. Due to his stay in Russia, Prince Miloš gave him the nicknames Baćuška or Baća, which stuck for the rest of his life.

References

1808 births
1865 deaths
Finance ministers of Serbia
Government ministers of Serbia
19th-century Serbian people
Politicians from Smederevo
Foreign ministers of Serbia
Education ministers of Serbia
Justice ministers of Serbia